Pastor Alvin A. Darling (born December 23, 1948) is an American gospel musician. He started his music career, in 1990, with the release of two albums by Savoy Records, I've Learned to Put My Trust in God and Expect a Miracle. His next album was released by I Am Records in 1992, Medley of Praise, and an album was released with GGI Records in 1994, Hold On...To The Promise. His next two albums, 1995's There's an Answer in Prayer and 1998's Blessing Coming Through for You, was released by Savoy Records. The next four albums, 2005's You Deserve My Worship, 2007's My Blessing Is on the Way, 2009's You Can Make It, and Waiting Right Here, was released by Emtro Gospel Records. He would get five of these album to chart upon the Billboard Gospel Albums chart, and two of them got placements on the Heatseekers Albums chart. His is a GMA Dove Awards and Stellar Awards nominated artist.

Early life
Darling was born in Newark, New Jersey, as Alvin A. Darling on December 23, 1948, yet his birth parents refused to raise him, so his grandmother, Lilla Darling, took him to raise. He was first reared in the church at Smith Memorial Church of God in Christ Church by his grandmother in his hometown. Later in his teenage years, Darling attended, Deliverance Evangelistic Center, where the pastor was Rev. A. Skinner, and this was where he became a believer in Jesus Christ. He joined, Greater Mt. Zion Holy Church located in Cranford, New Jersey, that was being pastored by Bishop Charlie W. Bullock, and this is where he was called to become a minister in 1979. Darling would serve as one of their associate ministers, until he was installed as the lead pastor in October 2001. He now is the lead pastor of two churches, the aforementioned one, along with Old Ship of Zion Church located in Center Moriches, New York.

Music career
His music recording career commenced in 1990, with the release of two albums, I've Learned to Put My Trust in God and Expect a Miracle on October 17, 1990, by Savoy Gospel Records, yet both failed to chart. The subsequent album, Medley of Praise, was released in 1992 by I Am Records, and it was his breakthrough released upon the Billboard Gospel Albums at No. 26. He released, Hold On...To The Promise, on September 13, 1994, by CGI Records, but it did not chart. His next release, There's an Answer in Prayer, was released by Savoy Gospel Records on January 17, 1995, however it did not place on any charts. The album, Blessing Coming Through for You, released by them as well on September 15, 1998, and it performed likewise with no placements. His subsequent release, You Deserve My Worship, was released on April 12, 2005, and this time around it placed on the Gospel Albums chart at No. 44. He released, My Blessing Is on the Way, on April 17, 2007, by Emtro Gospel Records, and this charted at No. 20 on the aforementioned chart. The album, You Can Make It, was released by Emtro Gospel Records on October 20, 2009, and this placed on the Gospel Albums at No. 11, while getting a placement on the Heatseekers Albums at No. 29. His album, Waiting Right Here, was released in 2013 by Emtro Gospel Records, and it placed at No. 15 on the Gospel Albums, while it charted at No. 27 on the Heatseekers Albums. He received a Stellar Awards nomination at the 23rd edition, for Traditional Group/Duo of the Year category. He even got a GMA Dove Awards nomination at the 37th GMA Dove Awards for Traditional Gospel Recorded Song of the Year.

Personal life
Pastor Darling married his wife, Patricia A. Bullock Darling, in October 1973, and they reside in Cranford with their two sons, Christopher and Shaun.

Discography

References

External links
 Cross Rhythms artist profile
 New Release Tuesday artist profiel

Living people
1948 births
African-American songwriters
African-American Christians
Musicians from Newark, New Jersey
Songwriters from New Jersey
Songwriters from New York (state)
21st-century African-American people
20th-century African-American people